Lao Ngam is a district (muang) of Salavan province in southern Laos.

References

Districts of Salavan province